This is a list of Brazilian television related events from 2010.

Events
30 March - Marcelo Dourado wins the tenth season of Big Brother Brasil.
25 July - Actress Fernanda Souza and her partner Alexandre Porcel win the seventh season of Dança dos Famosos.
23 September - Israel Lucero wins the fifth season of Ídolos.

Debuts
August 9 - Meu Amigãozão (2010–present)

Television shows

1970s
Vila Sésamo (1972-1977, 2007–present)
Turma da Mônica (1976–present)

1990s
Malhação (1995–present)
Cocoricó (1996–present)

2000s
Big Brother Brasil (2002–present)
Dança dos Famosos (2005–present)
Ídolos (2006-2012)
Peixonauta (2009–present)

Ending this year

Births

Deaths

See also
2010 in Brazil
List of Brazilian films of 2010